The 1993–94 Segunda Divisão season was the 60th season of the competition and the 44th season of recognised third-tier football in Portugal.

Overview
The league was contested by 54 teams in 3 divisions with CD Feirense, União Lamas and Amora FC winning the respective divisional competitions and gaining promotion to the Liga de Honra.  The overall championship was won by Amora FC.

League standings

Segunda Divisão - Zona Norte

Segunda Divisão - Zona Centro

Segunda Divisão - Zona Sul

Footnotes

External links
 Portuguese Division Two «B» - footballzz.co.uk

Portuguese Third Division seasons
Port
3